Atimura is a genus of beetles in the family Cerambycidae, containing the following species:

 Atimura affinis Breuning, 1939
 Atimura apicalis Gahan, 1895
 Atimura bacillina Pascoe, 1863
 Atimura combreti Gardner, 1930
 Atimura cylindrica Gressitt, 1940
 Atimura formosana Matsushita, 1933
 Atimura fulva Schwarzer, 1925
 Atimura japonica Bates, 1873
 Atimura laosica Breuning, 1965
 Atimura minima Breuning, 1939
 Atimura nilghirica Breuning, 1940
 Atimura proxima Breuning, 1939
 Atimura punctissima Pascoe, 1865
 Atimura strandi Breuning, 1940
 Atimura subapicalis Breuning, 1949
 Atimura terminata Pascoe, 1863

References

 
Cerambycidae genera